The discography of Japanese singer-songwriter Koda Misono (best known by her stage name "misono") includes 4 studio albums, 2 compilation albums, 2 cover albums and 19 singles. Her releases have been under the record label Avex Trax, which is the first label under the Avex Group.

Although having debuted as the lead vocalist for the band day after tomorrow in 2002, misono debuted as a solo artist on March 29, 2006, with her single VS. The single debuted in the top five of the Oricon charts, but would become her only solo single to break the top five.

Despite releasing multiple singles annually, along with annual albums, misono's releases would fail to chart well. Her debut album Never+Land (2007) charted at No. 20, Sei -say- (2008) at No. 20, Me (2010) at No. 35 and Uchi (2014) at No. 49. Due to her decreasing sales, her final album, Uchi, had the message, "If we do not sell 10,000 albums, misono can't release another CD," as a subtitle to the album.

As of October 13, 2014, misono has not released another single or album.

Albums

Studio albums

Cover albums

Extended plays

Singles

Collaborations

Promotional videos

Never+Land
VS
Kojin Jugyō
Speedrive
Lovely♡Cat's Eye
A.__~answer~
Hot Time -Mud 1 Take ver.-
A.__~answer~ -Album ver.-
Suna no Shiro no Mermaid ~Riku to Umi no Sekai~

Sei -say-
Hot Time
Pochi
Zasetsu Chiten
Juunin Toiro
Mugen Kigen
Ninin Sankyaku
Zasetsu Chiten -BOX ver.-
Juunin Toiro −10 misono's ver.-
Mugen Kigen -Painting ver.-
Ninin Sankyaku -say ver.-

Me
Kazoku no Hi
Kyuukon ~Yaruki・Genki・Sono Ki no Nekko~
Tenbin ~Tsuyogari na Watashi×Yowagari na Kimi~
end=Start
Bokura Style
「...Suki×××」
0-ji Mae no Tsunderella
Watashi Iro
end=Start −4 misono's ver.-

Uchi
Ho・n・to・u・so
Maialino!
Koitsuri Girl Ai Girl ~Fishing Boy~
NO you! NO life! NO...××? feat. ME -ME direction ver.-
Uchi! Uchi! ROCK ~Toriatsukai Setsumeisho~

Tales with misono-Best-
Tales with misono−Best− Video Medley

symphony with misono Best
Starry Heavens (ver.2013)
Junction Punctuation Mark
61-byoume no... Fura Letter Saigo no Hatsukoi ~Copernicus Tekitenkai~

Cover album
misono to Utaou! Animedley I
Urusei Yatsura no Theme ~Lum no Love Song~

Universe
It's All Love! (Koda Kumi x misono)

Hello World
with you feat. Me (Back-On x misono)

Premium Cocoa
NO you! NO life! NO...××? feat. Me (Cocoa Otoko x misono)

References

External links
misono Official Site

misono
Pop music discographies